Group B of 2011-12 Liga Indonesia Premier Division second round was played from 26 to 1 July 2012. The pool was made up of host PSIM Yogyakarta, PS Sumbawa Barat, Persebaya DU (Bhayangkara) and PS Barito Putera.

Standings 

{| class=wikitable style="text-align:center"
|-
!width="165"|Team
!width="20"|
!width="20"|
!width="20"|
!width="20"|
!width="20"|
!width="20"|
!width="20"|
!width="20"|
|- style="background:#cfc;"
|align=left|PSIM Yogyakarta
|3||3||0||0||5||2||+3||9
|- style="background:#cfc;"
|align=left|PS Barito Putera
|3||1||1||1||6||3||+3||4
|- 
|align=left|Persebaya DU (Bhayangkara)
|3||1||0||2||4||7||−3||3
|-
|align=left|PS Sumbawa Barat
|3||0||1||2||2||5||−3||1
|}

All times local (WIB)

Barito Putera vs Persebaya DU (Bhayangkara) 

Assistant referees:
 Dadang Sutisna
 Dadang Talani
Fourth official:
 Sunardi

West Sumbawa vs PSIM 

Assistant referees:
 Sriguna Tarigan
 Sutikno
Fourth official:
 Najamuddin Aspiran

Persebaya DU (Bhayangkara) vs PSIM 

Assistant referees:
 Sutikno
 Sriguna Tarigan
Fourth official:
 Najamuddin Aspiran

Barito Putera vs West Sumbawa 

Assistant referees:
 Dadang Sutisna
 Dwi Wiratmono
Fourth official:
 Suharto

West Sumbawa vs Persebaya DU (Bhayangkara)

PSIM vs Barito Putera

References 

Group A